Little Grill Collective, a worker-owned cooperative restaurant in Harrisonburg, Virginia, was started in June 2003 in a building that has been operating as a restaurant since the 1930s.  It is a member of the U.S. Federation of Worker Cooperatives.  It is known for its quirky, eclectic, down-home atmosphere, with boxes of old Trivial Pursuit cards on the tables. As a quaint and cozy music venue, the Grill has served as a launch for musical acts such as The Hackensaw Boys and Old Crow Medicine Show.

Ceasing operations in September 2022, its previous owners are working toward a relaunch in early 2023.

History
The Little Grill has been a restaurant in Harrisonburg, Virginia, since the 1940s; before that it was an antique store in the 1930s and a communal bathhouse for a nearby swimming pool in the 1920s. In the early 1980s, Christopher Boyer, working for then owner and "master chef" Maria Prytula—a Ukrainian-born artist and poet (d. 2012)—started renting the place out on weekend nights to present rock shows and theater.  The restaurant's "hippified" atmosphere began during this period. Chris bought the restaurant in 1985 with blues musician and Little Grill cook, Bob Driver—at which point the diner became a full-service restaurant serving three meals a day, with live entertainment on the weekends. John Eckman bought out Boyer's share of the business in 1986, and he and Driver sold the restaurant to Tom Kildea in 1990.  Kildea sold the restaurant to his former employee Ron Copeland in 1992.

Copeland introduced menu changes aimed at appealing to healthy-minded diners and vegetarians. He also removed from sale all products produced by multinational corporations such as Coca-Cola, Anheuser-Busch, Miller, Coors, and Folgers from the restaurant.

Free Food For All Soup Kitchen

Copeland's initial contribution was a Free Food For All Soup Kitchen, which served hot, homemade noon meals at the diner without charge to "anyone in the world" every Monday from October 1992 on.  This soup kitchen led to the long-term creation of Our Community Place which now exists in a former Salvation Army building across the street.

Worker-owned cooperative
When Copeland decided to sell the Grill, after feeling a religious calling to Christian seminary, individual employees he approached were not interested in buying.  He considered some sort of group ownership, and began researching models found in The Cheeseboard Collective in Berkeley, California and the Mondragon cooperatives in the Basque region of Spain; key features of a collective being a vote for each owner, and share of profits apportioned according to labor input (not capital).  In 2002, regular meetings began with Grill workers with an aim toward forming a worker-owned corporation—which would ultimately be called The Little Grill Cooperative. In June 2003, this new collective purchased the restaurant from Copeland, using what they called "community financing" to procure the down payment. Since then the collective aimed to work for localizing the food and creating what they regards as "a healthy work environment for a fulfilling job experience".

The video The Little Grill was created by JMU students in November 2008, describing how the Little Grill Collective began. A smartphone app launched September 2011 "allows users mobile access to the menu, blog updates and even trivia questions highlighting the eatery's history."

Operations ceased 
On September 13, 2022 the worker-owners announced via a Facebook post that they could no longer continue operating in their current form and that they were "taking some time to take a hard and critical look at our business operations; and exploring potential evolutions of the Grill into a new entity." Robert Driver, a musician who co-owned the diner in the 1980s, when asked what would happen if it closed for good said, “There would be profound sadness because if The Little Grill is to stop operating as that entity then that’s truly the end of an era in Harrisonburg." He added:

Ownership 

Little Grill Collective is a worker-owned, democratically managed cooperative, where members have joined together to produce goods and/or services for sale. Each new worker-owner at Little Grill buys into the business to solidify ownership. Profits are distributed to the members "on the basis of patronage (buying at, working at or selling through the business)." Business control is exercised by membership on a one-member/one-vote basis.The ratio of worker-owners to employees fluctuates regularly, generally being about half owners, half employees. Employees have the opportunity to become owners after working a minimum of 6 months. Coordinators are designated for many operational aspects of the restaurant such as: "arts and entertainment (music and art shows), back of house (kitchen systems and food ordering), financial (bills, payroll and taxes), front of house (training, dining room), human resources (schedule and hiring), human relations (evaluations, mediations), maintenance (building repairs, inspections), public relations (advertising), and retail foods (catering)." Coordinators have autonomy to make certain decisions and spend money without consulting with the group. Owners and employees "can get paid to work on" committees addressing any of these areas.

Membership meets twice a month to "go over our financial reports, check in with new hires, make announcements, introduce ideas, set the dates for other meetings, create committees, and make a wide range of decisions." A different owner is selected to "solidify the agenda and facilitate each meeting." Decisions are made "on a consensus basis . . with an 80% majority."

Collective history 
When then owner Ron Copeland decided to attend graduate school, he knew he didn't want to see The Little Grill close as a result. Friends encouraged him to investigate worker-owned cooperatives such as Cheese Board Collective in Berkeley, California. Discovering mentorship and guidance there, Copeland and a half dozen others worked together to launch The Little Grill Collective in 2003. He says of the time:

Casa Nueva, a worker-owned collective restaurant in Athens, Ohio, hosted Grill working team members to support the launch.

Collective owners 
Not everyone who worked at the collective became an owner, but 9-12 of the employees usually signed on for the privilege at any one time. Worker-owners of Little Grill Collective as of April 2015 (date joined cooperative in parentheses):

A list of former worker-owners is maintained at the Little Grill webpage.

The collective had survived almost two decades when it ceased operations in September 2022, with just five worker-owners lasting until then.

Previous owners return 
Ron and Melaine Copeland, who owned The Little Grill from 1992 to 2003 — before helping its employees convert it to a worker-owned collective — have signed a lease on the building and intend to restart operations in 2023. Ron discovered The Little Grill, a "staple restaurant with an eighty-year pedigree", as a James Madison University student. He started working there in the mid-1980s. He and Melaine married in 1994, running the diner together. (While dating Melaine, Ron wrote, “I love you,” in green paint over the salmon pink on the walls, encircling it with a heart — which is still visible today.)

The Copelands wanted to ensure that one of Harrisonburg’s most-loved spots survived. “The Little Grill really is a treasure in the Harrisonburg community and we just wanted to see that perpetuate,” says Melaine. Adds Ron, “I didn’t want to drive by and see it not open or torn down or something and know that I could’ve done something, ya know. I just don’t know if I would’ve been able to really live with that.”

They have now purchased the business back from the collective, but are dropping the worker-owned aspect of the business. Says Ron Copeland of why the restaurant didn't survive COVID-19 as a cooperative, "The challenge of a worker cooperative is there’s no equity. You work hard and you get your share of the profit but then when its time to go you don’t really get anything. It’s a cool thing for a lot of reasons but that’s one of the downsides."

“We’re going to have espresso now, so we’re gonna be learning about that and getting our menu straight, cooking for ourselves, learning our new POS system, all that — so we have a lot of moving parts." Copeland adds. To finance start-up, the returning owners are  selling “personal grill accounts” for $1,000 each which can be used to purchase meals and leave tips once the diner reopens.

On February 18, 2023, as part of massive reopening efforts, James Madison University students as part of GIVE (Growth International Volunteer Excursions) Andy Luong, head volunteer coordinator at GIVE, and five other volunteers from James Madison University helped take down the Little Grill sign for refurbishing, power wash exterior walls, and prep the interior for painting.

Both owners are alumni of nearby James Madison University, Ron in 1990 and Melanie in 1992 and both view The Little Grill as an important second home to the JMU. 

They have hired William “Billy” Bleecker, co-chef at Clementine Cafe in downtown Harrisonburg, as general manager.

Menu 
Since October 1992, the Little Grill menu aimed at appealing to healthy-minded eaters, vegetarians, and hippies. Tofu is included in several of their breakfast specials, including tofu rancheros, tofu scrambler, tofu burrito, and tofu grinder. Blue Monkey pancakes (bananas and blueberries in buttermilk batter) have inspired a T-shirt, featuring a blue monkey eating pancakes, for sale in the restaurant . ."

Lunch offerings included felafel and lemon tahini appetizer, made with homemade felafel balls and served with homemade lemon tahini dressing. Sandwiches are made with tempeh and locally-sourced free-range chicken and hamburger.

All bread products — wheat sub rolls; cinnamon swirl sourdough; wheat, white, and rye breads — are sourced from a local baker in Dayton, Virginia. Bagels are baked at a local bagel bakery. Free-range eggs come from a local poultry provider.

To replace such multinational brands as Coca-Cola, Anheuser-Busch, Miller, Coors, and Folgers, The Grill uses natural and homemade substitutes.  Blue Sky provides the cream soda, Virgil's the root beer and cola, while diet sodas come from Zevia. Teas and coffee are all Equal Exchange.

Special nights
Prior to a summer 2015 menu transition, special menu nights at Little Grill happened on set days of the week. Tuesday was Mexi Night, Wednesday was Indian Night or Wildcard Special depending on the chef, Thursday was Breakfast Night, and Friday was Down Home Night/Southern Cookin'.

The Little Grill takes part in the semiannual Taste of Downtown, a week-long event that features lunch and dinner specials at most downtown Harrisonburg restaurants who put together discounted menu offerings and combos as a promotional activity initiated by Harrisonburg Downtown Renaissance, a nonprofit revitalization group, in 2008.

Relaunch 2023 
In their 2023 return to ownership of the restaurant, the Copeland's are committed to preserving what's best from the gustatory traditions, while introducing some surprises to the menu:

Entertainment

Little Grill offered entertainment from local writing, performing, musical, and comedic talents—through a regular weekly open stage and special shows.  Every Thursday night they would present an open mic for poets, storytellers, comics, and musicians, including students from James Madison University.  Historically, the founders of both The Hackensaw Boys and Old Crow Medicine Show—Robert St. Ours, David Sickmen, Rob Bullington, Chris "Critter" Fuqua, Ketch Secor, etc.—met and performed at the Little Grill open mic.

Special shows include fundraisers for local organizations, dramatic works created by owner and open mic emcee Chris Howdyshell, and comedy.  The first "Ha-Ha Fest" that occurred in February 2012 is a recent example of these.  "The Girl Who Died Most Mysteriously", a play with original songs written by Little Grill worker/owner Chris Howdyshell, was performed October 2011—with his musical group The Dish Dogs backing "a local cast of non-actors."

Wednesday nights had previously been reserved for a game of bingo involving diners as players.

Venue
As a music venue Little Grill is noted for showing upcoming and popular local and regional acts, as well as more broadly known groups.  Touring acts working their way down Interstate 81, perhaps from larger music markets up north such as Philadelphia or New York, to southern regions often stop in to perform. Local and regional acts which have appeared there include:  The Hackensaw Boys, The Steel Wheels, and Joe Overton and the Clear Blue Sky.  Many employees (and shared owners) of the Little Grill have been musicians, often appearing there themselves.  Owner Chris Howdyshell, who emcees the weekly open mic and puts on special shows, has formed Red River Rollercoaster and The Dish Dogs—often performing on the Little Grill stage.  He draws personnel from the Grill, such as Ashley Hunter and Joshua Vana.  Past musicians who have worked there include Robert St. Ours (founder of The Hackensaw Boys), his brother Phillip St. Ours (founder of Pantherburn), Billy Brett and Terry Turtle (founders of Buck Gooter), Lara Mack and Kyle Oehmke (both members of The Dish Dogs).  Others include Greg Ward and Nick Melas.

Three St. Ours brothers, Chris "Critter" Fuqua, and Ketch Secor founded the Route 11 Boys—precursor group to both The Hackensaw Boys and Old Crow Medicine Show.  Secor has said, regarding the role of Little Grill open mic in his musical career, it was "really the first chance that . . (he and) Critter had to play on stage."  Being "a bit younger" than the "college students at James Madison University who typically hung out there" Secor says "They knew that we had talent, but it was raw.  I mean, I was up there beating on a jaw harp when I was 13."

It was at Little Grill Ketch first saw his "contemporary" Robert St. Ours—who later went on to found The Hackensaw Boys—singing and "he was so cool with his leather jacket and side burns.  I knew that's what I wanted to do."  Secor formed the Route 11 Boys with St. Ours and his brothers and performed often at Little Grill.

Non-local acts known more prominently outside the region have included Andy Friedman, Paul Curreri and his wife Devon Sproule, housemates Danny Schmidt and Carrie Elkin, Anaïs Mitchell, Mary Gauthier, Tony Furtado, The Two Man Gentlemen Band, The Wiyos,  and Adrienne Young and Little Sadie, Of performing at Little Grill, Young has said: "Best show ever. The energy was so palatable (sic)."

Recording
The Little Grill venue has been used to record music.  Previous owner Tom Kildea recorded his album Love Like Wood there in 1999.

MACRoCk
Little Grill serves as a venue each year for The Mid-Atlantic College Radio Conference (MACRoCk), joining other downtown Harrisonburg venues Artful Dodger, Blue Nile, Clementine, Court Square Theater, and Downtown 34 Music (in 2011).

Including workshops, panels, and a label exposition, this college radio festival is funded by grass-roots businesses.

Musical acts that performed during the 2011 festival at Little Grill included: Low Branches, Bison, Wailin' Storms, Spirit Family Reunion, Auld Lang Syne, Luke Saunders, and Cat Magic Co. The Daily News-Record describes MACRoCk as an ...

Fundraisers

Adrienne Young & Little Sadie performed June 27, 2008 'Buy Fresh, Buy Local' in support of FoodRoutes Network (FRN), a national non-profit organization that aims to support other localized groups that encourage sustainable agriculture and community-based food systems. Her group headlined at the annual Our Community Place Lawn Jam the following day.

Noted area musicians organized and performed in a fundraiser in support of local musician and luthier Steve Parks, from nearby Dayton, who had been diagnosed with inoperable cancer, in 2008.  Performers included blues musician Bob Driver, former owner of the Grill; together they formed the musical group Parks & Driver.

Ketch Secor and Chris "Critter" Fuqua appeared there, together with Robert and Phillip St. Ours on January 14, 2012, to support Our Community Place.  If Johnny St. Ours had not been filming a documentary elsewhere, they might have had a complete reunion of the Route 11 Boys—precursor group to both The Hackensaw Boys (which Robert St. Ours helped found) and Old Crow Medicine Show (which Secor and Fuqua helped found).  This reunion was the first time that many of the original members of Route 11 Boys had performed together, and marked a return to Old Crow for Fuqua, a return to Harrisonburg for Secor, and a collective return to where it all began for all of them.

Having recently lost one of its original founders, the group had been going through a difficult time and was in need of a renewal. As Secor recounts:

Fuqua concurs that the "whole 'Ketch and Critter' tour" that year "was pretty special":

Extra special was the visit to the Grill for Fuqua:

Adding to their nostalgic return were their previous band mates and friends: "Our good buddies from the Route 11 boys, the St. Ours brothers, Phillip and Robert Holy Bear, got on stage with us, and that sealed the deal. Heaven."

Awards, honors, and distinctions

Little Grill was voted Best Breakfast and Best Vegetarian in the 2009, 2010, 2011, 2012, 2013, 2014, 2015, and 2016 Daily News-Record Best of the Valley survey.

Video
Ketch & Critter - "River of Jordan" live @ the Little Grill, Harrisonburg, VA 1/14/12 Ketch Secor and Chris "Critter" Fuqua of Old Crow Medicine Show perform at fundraiser for Our Community Place, January 14, 2012.
Big Men @ the Little Grill August 17, 2011: "Flatpicking champ (and former KS secretary of state) Chris Biggs and Living Legend Steve Hinrichs treat the crowd at the Little Grill to a rollicking instrumental."
Max Jeffers - 20th Century Blues at the Little Grill 5-20-11 "Max Jeffers plays 20th Century Blues at the Little Grill in Harrisonburg, VA with Uncle Mountain (NC) and Michael Bowman on 5-20-11."

See also
Music venue

Notes

External links 

Little Grill Collective Facebook page.
U.S. Worker

Harrisonburg, Virginia
Restaurants in Virginia
Music venues in Virginia
Buildings and structures in Rockingham County, Virginia
Tourist attractions in Rockingham County, Virginia
Restaurants established in 2003
Worker cooperatives of the United States
2003 establishments in Virginia